Mahenes semifasciatus is a species of beetle in the family Cerambycidae. It was described by Per Olof Christopher Aurivillius in 1922.

References

Acanthocinini
Beetles described in 1922